The Mayor of Reading, Pennsylvania, is the elected, chief executive of the city of Reading, Pennsylvania, the fourth-largest city in the state of Pennsylvania. The Reading city government consists of a mayor and a city council. The mayor is elected for a four-year term.

The Mayor of Reading served under a city commission form of government prior to 1996. However, the city's mayor have served under a home rule form of government since 1996, beginning with the inauguration of Mayor Paul Angstadt in January of that year.

Reading is one of the few United States cities to have elected a Socialist mayor. Three times, in 1927, 1935, and 1944, J. Henry Stump was elected mayor.

The current mayor is Eddie Moran, who was elected on November 5, 2019 and began serving his term on January 6, 2020.

List

References

Reading, Pennsylvania